The 1976 Arkansas State Indians football team represented Arkansas State University as a member of the Southland Conference during the 1976 NCAA Division I football season. Led by sixth-year head coach Bill Davidson, the Indians compiled an overall record of 5–6 with a mark of 2–3 in conference, tying for fourth place in the Southland.

Schedule

References

Arkansas State
Arkansas State Red Wolves football seasons
Arkansas State Indians football